Scott 4 is Scott Walker's fifth  solo album. It was released in late 1969 under his birth name, Scott Engel, and failed to chart. Reissues have been released under his stage name. It has since received praise as one of Walker's best works.

Content 
Scott 4 was the first Walker album to consist solely of self-penned songs. The preceding Scott, Scott 2 and Scott 3 albums had each featured a mixture of originals and covers, including several translations of Jacques Brel songs, which were later collected to form the album Scott Walker Sings Jacques Brel. Scott 4 also features slightly less ornate orchestral arrangements than its predecessors, opting instead for a more skeletal, folk-inspired sound with greater emphasis on the rhythm section.

The opening track, "The Seventh Seal," is based on the 1957 film of the same name by filmmaker Ingmar Bergman. The second track on side B, "The Old Man's Back Again (Dedicated to the Neo-Stalinist Regime)" refers to the 1968 Warsaw Pact invasion of Czechoslovakia.

The quote "a man's work is nothing but this slow trek to rediscover, through the detours of art, those two or three great and simple images in whose presence his heart first opened" (credited to the writer Albert Camus) appears on the back of the album sleeve.

Release 

The album failed to chart and was deleted soon after. It has been speculated that Walker's decision to release the album under his birth name of Scott Engel contributed to its chart failure. All subsequent re-issues of the album have been released under his stage name.

Today Scott 4 is considered one of his strongest works and it has been acknowledged in the book 1001 Albums You Must Hear Before You Die amongst others. It has also been praised by  the members of Radiohead.

It was voted number 760 in the third edition of Colin Larkin's All Time Top 1000 Albums (2000).

Track listing

Release history

References

External links

Scott Walker (singer) albums
1969 albums
Albums produced by Johnny Franz
Philips Records albums
Fontana Records albums
Art pop albums